Chris Bennett (born 15 January 1952) is a former footballer who played as a forward in the North American Soccer League. Born in England, he represented the Canada national team at international level. He was one of the original Vancouver Whitecaps players from their first season in 1974. Since retiring from playing, he has been a football coach and instructor in the Vancouver area.

Club career
An English immigrant to Canada, Bennett was a member of the Vancouver Whitecaps of the NASL in their inaugural season of 1974, playing 8 games and netting two goals and an assist. Just before the 1976 season, the Whitecaps traded Bennett to the Seattle Sounders in exchange for Tommy Baldwin. In 1978, he moved to the Memphis Rogues. Prior to going to North America, Bennett was a member of Chelsea in 1970 and '71, although he never played a first-team game . He played indoor soccer at some point, likely the 1978–9 season,  for the Cleveland Force.

International career
Bennett earned six 'A' caps between 1973 and 1975 for Canada, scoring once. He also earned four Olympic team caps in 1975, scoring once.

Coaching career
Bennett was a coach for 12 years with the Canadian Soccer Association, including 1998 to 2000 as the U-15 boys' team head coach as well as assistant coach to the U-20 side and as an interim to the national side. The U-20 men's team won the 1995-6 CONCACAF gold medal whereas the 1993-4 team finished third in the same tournament. From 2001 he has provided soccer coaching to his local community in Coquitlam and at Penticton, BC, Canada.

Bennett was in 2005 and possibly 2006 coach of the Whitecaps F.C. men's reserves. In 2004, he led the Whitecaps women's team to the W-League championship which subsequently led to his inauguration in the BC Sports Hall of Fame in 2007.

Special recognition
2004 - 2005 BC Directors Coaching Award, for dedication to the development of soccer through coaching 
2001 - 2002 Coach of the Year, North Coquitlam
2014 - Canadian Soccer Hall of Fame inductee

References

External links
Chris Bennett Soccer Academy
 / Canada Soccer Hall of Fame
'Canadian Soccer Association Press Release of Whitecaps hiring Bennett

NASL/MISL stats

1952 births
Living people
Canadian expatriate sportspeople in the United States
Canadian expatriate soccer players
Canada men's international soccer players
Canada Soccer Hall of Fame inductees
Canadian soccer players
Cleveland Force (original MISL) players
English footballers
English emigrants to Canada
Expatriate soccer players in the United States
Association football forwards
Major Indoor Soccer League (1978–1992) players
Memphis Rogues players
Naturalized citizens of Canada
North American Soccer League (1968–1984) players
Soccer people from British Columbia
People from Coquitlam
Seattle Sounders (1974–1983) players
Vancouver Whitecaps (1974–1984) players
English expatriate sportspeople in the United States
English expatriate footballers
English expatriate sportspeople in Canada
Expatriate soccer players in Canada